The St. Louis Stars were a soccer team based in St. Louis, Missouri that played in the original North American Soccer League from 1968 to 1977. The Stars were known for playing mostly American players, many from the St. Louis area, in contrast to other NASL teams' reliance on foreign players. The team moved to Anaheim in 1978 and became the California Surf.

History

1960s
The St. Louis Stars, founded in 1967 as a team in the National Professional Soccer League, were the first ever professional soccer team in St. Louis, although St. Louis had a long history of strong play in amateur leagues and college soccer. The Stars were headed by St. Louis businessman Bob Hermann. Hermann later went on to become president of the NPSL, and to create the Hermann Trophy, college soccer's version of the Heisman Trophy.
The Stars immediately stole the spotlight from the local amateur clubs and attracted many mainstream sports fans.  The first Stars team included players from nine different countries, with nine players from Yugoslavia, and the majority of the team did not speak English. The Stars' average attendance 7,613 was the highest in the league. After the season, the NPSL merged with the rival United Soccer Association to form the North American Soccer League.  The Stars became a member of the newly merged league.

Following the 1968 NASL season, the league was in trouble with ten franchises having folded. The team's owners cut back on players' salaries, and the team became semi-pro.
The 1969 season was split into two halves. The first half was called the International Cup, a double round-robin tournament in which the remaining NASL clubs were represented by teams imported from the United Kingdom. The Stars were represented by Kilmarnock F.C. of Scotland. The Stars came in last for the Cup with a 2–5–1 record. For the second half of the 1969 season, the teams returned to their normal rosters, and played a 16-game schedule with no playoffs.

1970s
After the first two money-losing seasons, the team's owners cut back.  The Stars became a semi-pro team, with players paid by the game and holding other jobs. Consequently, the team began to draw poor crowds, averaging fewer than 4,000 fans per game for the three seasons from 1969 to 1971.

On March 19, 1971, the Stars hosted the 1971 NASL Professional Hoc-Soc Tournament, which was the first indoor soccer tournament sanctioned by a Division One professional league in U.S. history. The Stars lost their opening match, 2–1, but rebounded, 2–0, to win the third place match up.

The Stars best season was 1972.  The Stars won the Southern Division that year, defeated the Rochester Lancers 2–1 in a semifinal match held at Busch Memorial Stadium in St. Louis, and in Final they lost 2–1 to the Cosmos in a match played at Hofstra Stadium in New York.  Pat McBride (MF) and John Sewell (DF) were named first team all-stars for the 1972 season.  The team's success reinvigorated fan appeal, leading the league in attendance in 1972 with close to 8,000 fans per match, and continuing to draw over 6,000 fans each season from 1972 to 1977.

The Stars' legacy is one of developing American players, in particular drawing players from the local St. Louis area talent pool, instead of recruiting aging foreign players with high contracts. From 1969 to 1976, the Stars' squads were mostly American players. The Stars could afford to rely on local talent because at the time St. Louis had strong college teams and amateur competitions, with St. Louis University winning 10 NCAA national championships from 1959 to 1973. This strategy is one of the reasons for the Stars' longevity (lasting ten seasons during some the NASL's most turbulent times), but often the team was mediocre. On February 13, 1974, the Stars played host (and lost, 11–4) to the Red Army team at the St. Louis Arena in the final match of Russian squad's three city, North American indoor soccer tour. St. Louis went on to participate in both the 1975 and 1976 NASL indoor tournaments with little success.

In 1975 the Stars signed a foreign star in Peter Bonetti.  Bonetti had played for England from 1966–1970, was the backup goalkeeper to Gordon Banks on England's winning team in the 1966 World Cup, and had started one match at the 1970 World Cup. Bonetti had a solid season with the Stars, and was named a NASL first-team all-star for the 1975 season. The Stars won the Central Division in 1975, defeated the L.A. Aztecs in the quarterfinals at Busch Memorial Stadium, and lost to the Portland Timbers in the semifinals.  John Sewell was named NASL Coach of the Year.

In 1977, the Stars once again recruited an English goalkeeper, Bill Glazier, who was supposed to be England's backup goalkeeper at the 1966 World Cup, but had suffered a broken leg. Glazier was not successful, however, as John Jackson won the starting goalkeeper role for the 1977 season. In 1977 the Stars finished second in the Northern Division, qualifying for the playoffs, where they lost in the first round to Rochester at Busch Memorial Stadium. Key players for the 1977 Stars team were DF Ray Evans (NASL second-team all-star) and MF Al Trost (NASL honorable mention).

From 1967–68 and 1971–74 the Stars played at Busch Memorial Stadium and from 1969 to 1970 and 1975–77 the home games were held at Francis Field.

Move to California
By 1977, the Stars emphasis on American players had begun to erode slightly. Although the 1977 squad was still mostly American, it did include eight Englishmen. There was an attempt to return to Busch for 1978, but the Stars were not able to secure a lease to their liking. With only small Francis Field available as an option and player salaries rising sharply, there seemed little alternative but to move. So after the 1977 season, the Stars moved to Anaheim and became the California Surf. Although the California Surf retained their core group of American (mostly St. Louis) players, under English coach  John Sewell the California Surf imported more English players.

Year-by-year

Honors

NPSL Commissioner's Cup
 1967 runner-up

NASL championships
 1972 runner-up

Division titles
 1972 Southern Division
 1975 Central Division

Rookie of the Year
 1970 Jim Leeker
 1972 Mike Winter

Coach of the Year
 1972 Casey Frankiewicz
 1975 John Sewell

U.S. Soccer Hall of Fame
 1989 Bob Kehoe
 1989 Willy Roy
 1994 Pat McBride
 2001 Bob Hermann
 2006 Al Trost

Indoor Soccer Hall of Fame
 2012 Dragan Popović

All-Star first team selections
 1968 Casey Frankiewicz
 1969 Joe Puls
 1971 Dragan Popović
 1972 Pat McBride, John Sewell
 1975 Peter Bonetti

All-Star second team selections
 1970 Pat McBride
 1971 Casey Frankiewicz
 1972 Wilf Tranter
 1973 Pat McBride
 1976 Al Trost
 1977 Ray Evans

All-Star honorable mentions
 1972 Casey Frankiewicz, Joe Puls
 1973 John Sewell, Al Trost
 1977 Al Trost

Indoor All-Stars
 1971 Dragan Popović, Miguel de Lima

Leading scorers

 1967 –  Rudi Kölbl (15 G)
 1968 –  Kazimierz Frankiewicz (16 G)
 1969 –  Tommy Ferguson (7 G)
 1970 –  Pat McBride (7 G)
 1971 –  Kazimierz Frankiewicz (14 G)
 1972 –  Willy Roy (7 G)
 1973 –  Willy Roy (7 G)
 1974 –  Dennis Vaninger (6 G)
 1975 –  John Hawley (11 G)
 1976 –  Al Trost (12 G)
 1977 –  Fred Binney (9 G)

Coaches
  George Mihaljevic (1967)
  Rudi Gutendorf (1968)
  Bob Kehoe (1969–70)
  George Meyer and  Casey Frankiewicz (1971)
  Casey Frankiewicz (1972–73)
  John Sewell (1974–78)

See also
 Soccer in St. Louis
 California Surf (1978–81)
 St. Louis Steamers (1979–88)
 St. Louis Storm (1989–92)
 St. Louis Ambush (1992–2000)
 AC St. Louis (2010)
 Saint Louis FC (2015–present)

References

External links
 St. Louis Stars on FunWhileItLasted.net

St. Louis
Stars
Association football clubs established in 1967
Association football clubs disestablished in 1977
Defunct indoor soccer clubs in the United States
Defunct soccer clubs in Missouri
National Professional Soccer League (1967) franchises
North American Soccer League (1968–1984) teams
Kilmarnock F.C.
Soccer clubs in Missouri
1967 establishments in Missouri
1977 disestablishments in Missouri